The Olonets electoral district was a constituency created for the 1917 Russian Constituent Assembly election. The electoral district covered the Olonets Governorate. Olonets had special electoral system, electing 2 deputies and with each voter having 2 votes.

Candidates
Five candidates were in the fray for the 2 seats from Olonets. Andrey Fedorovich Matveev of the Socialist-Revolutionary Party and Matvei Dmitrievich Shishkin of the Russian Social Democratic Labour Party (Mensheviks) ran on List 1 - Soviet of Peasants' Deputies. The Kadet Party had fielded Deyakonov and Melekhov on its List 2. List 3 - 'Citizens of Vazhinskaya Volost, Olonets Uezd' had a single candidate (Mirokhin), who was a member of Plekhanov's Unity faction.

Results

References

Electoral districts of the Russian Constituent Assembly election, 1917
Olonets Governorate